The following is a list of Liberian politicians, both past and present.



B 
Barclay, Arthur 
Barclay, Edwin
Barnes, Nathaniel 
Benson, Stephen Allen
Blah, Moses
Blamo, John Bernard
Boakai, Joseph Nyuma 
Boley, George 
Bright, William O. Davies
Brown, Lewis
Brumskine, Charles
Bryant, Gyude

C 
Captan, Monie
Cheapoo, Chea
Cheeseman, Joseph James 
Coleman, William David
Conneh, Sekou
Cooper, Isaac Joseph

D 
Dennis, Charles Cecil
Dennis, Gabriel Lafayette
Divine, Samuel Raymond
Doe, Jackson
Doe, Samuel 
Dogolea, Enoch
Dossen, J. J. 
Dukuly, Momolu
Dukuly, Morris
Dunbar, Charles Benedict
Dweh, George

E 
Eastman, Ernest

F 
Fahnbulleh, Henry
Farhat, David
Faulkner, Thomas J.

G 
Gardiner, Anthony William
Gbala, David
Gbollie, Fayah
Gibson, Garretson Wilmot
Greene, James Edward
Grimes, Joseph Rudolph
Grimes, Louis Arthur

H 
Hanson, John
Harris, Sion
Henries, Richard
Herring, Amos
Hill, Samuel D.
Howard, Daniel Edward

J 
Jallah, Armah 
Johnson, J. Rudolph
Johnson, Wesley 
Johnson,"Prince" Yormie 
Johnson Sirleaf, Ellen
Johnson, Hilary R.W.
Jayjay, Roosevelt Gasolin

K 
Kesselley, Edward
Kiadii, George
Kieh, George Klay 
King, Charles D.B. 
Konneh, Amara Mohamed 
Korto, Joseph 
Koukou, George 
Kpolleh, Gabriel
Kpoto, Keikura
Kpoto, Robert 
Kpormakor, David 
Kromah, Alhaji G.V.
Kuyon, Bismarck
Lartin S.M. Konneh, Sr

L 
Lansanah, Lahai Ghabye
Larsah, Jr.,  James Nan
Lartin S.M. Konneh, Sr.

M 
Massaquoi, Roland 
Matthews, Gabriel Baccus
Minor, Grace Beatrice
Clarence K. Momolu
Moniba, Harry
Monkornomana, Nyudeh
Morlu, John
Muah, Sebastian
Musuleng-Cooper, Dorothy

N 
Nimely, Thomas
Nyenabo, Isaac
Nimene, John Wilmot Wleh

P 
Payne, James Spriggs
Perry, Ruth
Peal, Samuel Edward
Priest, James M.

R 
Reeves, Alfred
Roberts, Joseph Jenkins
Ross, J. J. 
Ross, Samuel Alfred 
Roye, Edward James
Russell, Alfred Francis

S 
Sankawulo, Wilton G.S. 
Sawyer, Amos 
Sheriff, Martin
Sherman, Reginald 
Sherman, Varney
Simpson, Clarence Lorenzo
Sirleaf, Momolu
Smith, James Skivring
Snowe, Edwin
Sorsor, Massayan K. (KMass)

T 
Taylor, Charles
Tipoteh, Togba-Nah
Tokpa, Alaric
Tokpah J. Mulbah
Tolbert, Frank
Tolbert, William
Tor-Thompson, Margaret
Townsend, E. Reginald 
Tubman, William V.S. 
Tubman (Jr.), William V.S. 
Tubman, Winston
Twe, Didhwo
Tyler, Alex

U 
Varmah, Eddington

W 
Warner, Bennie D.
Warner, Daniel Bashiel
Weah, George
Weeks, Rocheforte Lafayette
Wesley, Henry Too
Woah-Tee, Joseph
Wolokollie, Dusty
Wotorson, Cletus

Y 
Yancy, Allen 
Yates, Beverly

 
Politicians